Plaskitt is an English surname. Notable people with the surname include:

Frederick Plaskitt (1867–1926), English tennis player
Geoffrey Plaskitt (born 1940), English cricketer
James Plaskitt (born 1954), British politician
Nigel Plaskitt (born 1950), English actor, puppeteer, television producer and director

See also
Plaskett (disambiguation)